The 1954–55 AHL season was the 19th season of the American Hockey League. Six teams played 64 games each in the schedule. The "Carl Liscombe Trophy" for the league's top scorer is renamed to the John B. Sollenberger Trophy. The All-Star game is revived, with the AHL All-Stars taking on the defending champions Calder Cup champions from the previous season. The Pittsburgh Hornets finished first overall in the regular season, and won their second Calder Cup championship.

Team changes
 The Syracuse Warriors move back to West Springfield, Massachusetts, reverting to their old name, the Springfield Indians.

Final standings
Note: GP = Games played; W = Wins; L = Losses; T = Ties; GF = Goals for; GA = Goals against; Pts = Points;

Scoring leaders

Note: GP = Games played; G = Goals; A = Assists; Pts = Points; PIM = Penalty minutes

 complete list

Calder Cup playoffs
First round
Pittsburgh Hornets defeated Springfield Indians 3 games to 1.
Buffalo Bisons defeated Cleveland Barons 3 games to 1.
Finals
Pittsburgh Hornets defeated Buffalo Bisons 4 games to 2, to win the Calder Cup. 
 list of scores

All Star Classic
The second AHL All-Star game was played on October 27, 1954, after a 12-year hiatus. The defending Calder Cup champions Cleveland Barons lost 7-3 to the AHL All-Stars, in a game played at the Hershey Sports Arena, in Hershey, Pennsylvania.

Trophy and Award winners
Team Awards

Individual Awards

See also
List of AHL seasons

References
AHL official site
AHL Hall of Fame
HockeyDB

American Hockey League seasons
2